Schmutzdecke (German, "dirt cover" or dirty skin, sometimes wrongly spelled schmutzedecke) is a hypogeal biological layer formed on the surface of a slow sand filter. The schmutzdecke is the layer that provides the effective purification in potable water treatment, the underlying sand providing the support medium for this biological treatment layer.

The composition of any particular schmutzdecke varies, but will typically consist of a gelatinous biofilm matrix of bacteria, fungi, protozoa, rotifera and a range of aquatic insect larvae. As a schmutzdecke ages, more algae tend to develop, and larger aquatic organisms may be present including some bryozoa, snails and annelid worms.

References
 

Environmental soil science
Mycology
Water treatment
German words and phrases